Ohanavan is a village in the Ashtarak Municipality of the Aragatsotn Province of Armenia. Ohanavan was resettled in 1828 by emigrants from Muş. On a nearby escarpment sits the 13th-century Hovhannavank Monastery. Both the town and the monastery are situated atop a steep gorge carved by the Kasagh river.

Gallery

References 

World Gazetteer: Armenia – World-Gazetteer.com

Kiesling, Rediscovering Armenia, p. 21, available online at the US embassy to Armenia's website

Populated places in Aragatsotn Province